Garrett Richard Wang (born December 15, 1968) is an American actor. Wang is known for his role in Star Trek: Voyager as Ensign Harry Kim.

Early life
Wang was born in Riverside, California, to Taiwanese immigrant parents. He has one sister. Growing up, Wang moved often. He attended kindergarten in Indiana before moving to Bermuda, then to Memphis, Tennessee, and then back to California.

In the summer of 1990, he attended a Taiwanese-state sponsored cultural exchange program, which was the first time in his life when he wasn't the only Asian around. One of the reasons he decided to get into acting was to provide for other Asian Americans a role model in the entertainment industry—a predominantly non-Asian environment. Wang graduated from Harding Academy High School in Memphis.

Wang's parents were not supportive of his acting ambitions. His father emigrated from Taiwan to attend graduate school in the States and did not view acting as a stable career choice.  His mother had been accepted to Taiwan School of Drama in her youth but did not go due to her father's objections. When his parents met actress Bonnie Franklin at an airport in Hawaii, she told them that Wang would never make it in the business. His mother eventually even suggested that he join the military to learn some discipline.

Wang attended UCLA. He switched majors multiple times, going from biology to political science to history to economics and finally Asian studies with all his upper-division electives in theater.

Career
When Wang decided to become a full-time actor, he made a deal with his parents that he would quit after two years on the condition that they helped finance his expenses. After months of not landing anything, he managed to book a few roles in commercials. This subsequent exposure got him a guest star role in 1994 on the episode "Submission:Impossible" of Margaret Cho's All-American Girl as Raymond Han, who is, ironically enough, a financially stable bachelor who is also a doctor.

Wang starred in Eric Koyanagi's MFA thesis film at USC film school, Angry Cafe (1995). He subsequently came back to star in Koyanagi's feature directorial debut, hundred percent (1998), which also was Wang's feature debut. Both films were written, directed, and starred Asian Americans.

A year and a half after his wager with his parents, Wang landed his most recognizable role: Ensign Harry Kim in Star Trek: Voyager, which ran from 1995 to 2001.

In 2005, Wang played the role of Chow Ping in the TV miniseries Into The West, which was executive produced by Steven Spielberg.

He played the part of Garan in the 2007 fan production Star Trek: Of Gods and Men, saying, "it’s always more challenging for an actor to play the bad guy."

Theatre 
In 1993, Wang portrayed John Lee, a gay British Chinese teenager who kills his Irish lover, in Chay Yew's play, Porcelain, at the now defunct Burbage Theater in Sawtelle, Los Angeles, while still a student at UCLA.

Star Trek
From early childhood on, actor Garrett Wang was a science-fiction fan, in particular Star Wars and Battlestar Galactica.

He watched all the Star Trek films that came out in the theaters, but never really got into Star Trek: The Next Generation (TNG) prior to working on Voyager. The first season-one TNG episode he watched was "Code of Honor", which Garrett says is widely considered by all Trek writers to be the worst episode of Star Trek ever produced. On three occasions (in a span of a year and a half), he tried to watch TNG again, and it was always a repeat of "Code of Honor". Wang considers this a good thing, as he believes if he had been a huge fan of TNG, he might have been so nervous during his auditions for Voyager that he might have ended up losing the role altogether.

At Star Trek Las Vegas in 2014, Wang was announced to be reprising his role as Harry Kim in "Delta Rising", the second expansion of the massively multiplayer online role-playing game, Star Trek Online.

Conventions 
He has been a celebrity moderator interviewing other celebrities at various conventions around the world since 2008.

In 2010, Wang was named the director of the Trek Track for Dragon Con, becoming the first actor to work behind the scenes at a convention.

Wang has participated in the Calgary Comic and Entertainment Expo, in 2012 interviewing Stan Lee and being present at a booth among other exhibitors, as well as being a surprise speaker at TNG Exposed.

Personal life 

Through November 2017, Wang hosted a weekly podcast on Twitch. He discussed his post-Star Trek work as being a convention moderator, and other anecdotes of his life.

He currently co-hosts The Delta Flyers Podcast with Robert Duncan McNeill, who portrayed Tom Paris in Voyager.
He is also a Baptist.

Filmography

Film

Television

Video games

References

External links

 Interview about his career and views on Star Trek (GeeksOn): Interview proper starts at 27min50sec

1968 births
20th-century American male actors
21st-century American male actors
American male actors of Chinese descent
American male actors of Taiwanese descent
American male film actors
American male television actors
American male voice actors
American people of Taiwanese descent
American podcasters
Living people
Male actors from Riverside, California
University of California, Los Angeles alumni